Parque de los Príncipes is a station of the Seville Metro on the line 1. It is located at the intersection of the avenues of República Argentina and López de Gomara, in the neighborhood of Los Remedios. Parque de los Príncipes is an underground station, located between Blas Infante and Plaza de Cuba stations on the same line. It was opened on April 2, 2009. Is expected that in the future, the station will have a connection with the line 4 of the subway (that it is still in planning phase).

Connections
Bus: 5, 6, C1, C2, M-140, M-150, M-151, M-152, M-153, M-162, M-240

See also
 List of Seville metro stations

References

External links 
  Official site.
 History, construction details and maps.

Seville Metro stations
Railway stations in Spain opened in 2009